Patriarch Antony I or Patriarch Anthony I may refer to:

 Antony I of Constantinople, Archbishop of Constantinople and Ecumenical Patriarch from 821 to 837
 Antony I, Serbian Patriarch, Archbishop of Peć and Serbian Patriarch from 1571 to 1574
 Antony I, Eritrean Patriarch, Archbishop of Asmara and Eritrean Patriarch from 2004 to 2007

See also
 Patriarch (disambiguation)
 Antony (disambiguation)